"English and Welsh" is J. R. R. Tolkien's inaugural O'Donnell Memorial Lecture of 21 October 1955. The lecture sheds light on Tolkien's conceptions of the connections of race, ethnicity, and language.

Publication
It was first published in Angles and Britons in 1963 and was republished in The Monsters and the Critics, and Other Essays in 1983.

Contents

Tolkien begins with an overview of the terms "British", "Celtic", "Germanic", "Saxon", "English" and "Welsh", explaining the last term's etymology in walha.

Tolkien also addresses the historical language contact between English and Welsh since the Anglo-Saxon invasion of Britain, including Welsh loanwords and substrate influence found in English, and conversely English loanwords in Welsh. Comparing the Germanic i-mutation and the Celtic affection, Tolkien says:

In the final part of the lecture Tolkien explores the concept of phonaesthetics, citing "cellar door" as a phrase recognised as sounding beautiful in English and adding that, to his own taste, in Welsh "cellar doors are extraordinarily frequent". Tolkien describes the working of phonaesthetics inherent in the moment of association of sound and meaning:

Tolkien alludes to his view that such tastes are inherited, "an aspect in linguistic terms of our individual natures. And since these are largely historical products, the predilections must be so too." To refer to such an inherited taste of language, Tolkien introduces the term "native tongue" as opposed to "cradle tongue".

Influence 
Tolkien notes in his lecture that "Most English-speaking people … will admit that 'cellar door' is beautiful, especially if dissociated from its sense and from its spelling. More beautiful than, say, 'sky', and far more beautiful than 'beautiful' … Well then, in Welsh, for me cellar doors are extraordinarily frequent." This interest in and appreciation of Welsh influenced his own invented languages, notably the Elvish language Sindarin.

This lecture is considered Tolkien's "last major learned work". There are several important aspects to it. First, it "includes a valuable contribution to the study of the place of Britons in Anglo-Saxon England". Secondly, it offers a warning against racial theories. Third, it presents Tolkien's hypothesis of "inborn" linguistic tastes, which then leads into a discussion of his own views of aesthetics in language. Finally, it provides a (correct) hypothesis on the origins of the word "w(e)alh", which in turn provides an explanation of what happened to Celtic when the Anglo-Saxons invaded.

References

Tolkien, J. R. R., "English and Welsh" in The Monsters and the Critics, 1983

Essays by J. R. R. Tolkien
History of the English language
Language contact
Phonaesthetics
1955 essays
Welsh language
Comparison of Indo-European languages